Kim Ji-hoon (May 5, 1973 – December 12, 2013) was a South Korean singer, songwriter, record producer, actor, television presenter, and VJ. He is best known as the lead singer of Two Two and lead singer and leader of 'Duke', which is another Korean pop group.

His representative works are 'One and a Half' (일과 이분의 일) and 'Starian' (Lyrics by Duke, Composed by Kim Ji-hoon). He died by suicide in December 12, 2013.

Death
On December 12, 2013, around 1 p.m. (KST), Kim was found dead, after hanging himself by the neck on a t-shirt wrapped around a shower stall, in his hotel room, by a younger acquaintance who had plans with him to eat lunch together that day.

Early life

Educational Background 
 Seoul Buksung Elementary School
 Hanseong Middle School
 Seoul Inchang High School
 Myongji College (major in Practical Music)

Discography

Regular albums
 Two Two
 TWO TWO(a.k.a. 일과 이분의 일) (1994)
 TWO TWO 2 (1995)

Solo
 KIM JI HOON VOL. 1 (1997)

Duke
 2000 Duke Part One (1999)
 Two House – Prism(2000)
 In Autumn (A Road, Sky And D.K) (2002)
 Pornography (2004)

Special Edition 
 Gang First Album (1998)
 Duke Summer Special (2001)
 Duke Story of Winter (Winter Special Great Hit Remix) (2002)
 The Rebirth of Duke (2006)
 Kim Ji Hoon Memorial album (김지훈 정식 추모앨범) (2014) : Even Teardrops in your Eyes (그대 눈물까지도) (Digital Single)

Compilation albums 
 '90 KBS Youth Song Festival (KBS 청소년 창작가요제) (1991) : A Passed Moment Turn into the Broken Heart (지나간 순간은 찢겨진 가슴되어)
 '94 Tomorrow Will be Late (내일은 늦으리) (1994) : To the Beautiful World (아름다운 세상으로), The Cry of a Warrior (용사의 외침)
 Christmas of Roo'ra and Two Two (1994)
 Guardian angel (2001) : Guardian angel
 Dj처리의 Cross Over Vol. 1 (2001) : Last Night's Story, One Night Stand
 Happy Christmas Last Christmas(2001) : X-Mas Party (Feat. DJ 사빈, DJ 이탁)
 Stars on 45 Carol – 45 Celebrities who Honored Christmas (크리스마스를 빛낸 45인의 명사들) (2002) : Feliz Navidad 
 I Love Christmas + Dance + Hiphop (2002) : White Christmas [Kim Ji-hoon, Seong-ho, So Chan-whee, As One, Lee Ji-hoon, Chae Ri-na, J.G, Cha Hee-mang]
 Kiss in the Rain (2004) : We Can Do, Love Hunters
 Golden Bride OST (2007) : I Love You (a.k.a. 사랑합니다)
 Lee Eun Ha, My Song My Jazz (2012) : You don't have to say you love me (Feat. Kim Ji-hoon)

Filmography

Sitcom

Film

Musical

Advertising

Awards

References

External links 
 Naver People Search – Kim Ji-hoon (singer)
 Musical – 'The Great Show'
 Non stop3 Official Homepage

1973 births
2013 suicides
South Korean male singers
People from Seoul
South Korean male film actors
South Korean male television actors
Suicides by hanging in South Korea
2013 deaths